Daloon (Chinese: The big dragon) is a Danish foodproducer, founded in 1960 by Chinese Sai-chiu Van in Charlottenlund under the name Vans products (Danish:Vans produkter). In 1970 the company moved to Nyborg.

Daloons most famous products is spring roll.

Administrative director was Hemming Van, son of the founder.

At the end of 2015 it was announced that the privately held company was sold to the dutch frozen snack food producer Izico, which is owned by the dutch investment fund Egeria.

References

External links 
 official site

Food and drink companies of Denmark
Danish companies established in 1960
Companies based in Nyborg Municipality